"Sabotage" is a song by American singer Bebe Rexha, from her second studio album Better Mistakes. It was released on April 16, 2021, as the third single from the album.

Release 
On April 14, 2021, Rexha announced on her social media platforms that the song was going to be released as the third single off her upcoming album, Better Mistakes along its pre-order. The song was released on April 16 accompanied by its music video.

Composition
"Sabotage" was written by Rexha along Jon Hume, Michael Matosic and Greg Kurstin, the last also producing the song. It has been described as a pop ballad which displays a "straight-from-the-heart" lyricism and talks about how she sabotages her best moments. Rexha herself stated that the track is the "most vulnerable" on Better Mistakes.

Music video
The music video for the track was premiered the song's release date. It was directed by Christian Breslauer. The clip features Rexha in an abandoned house with meadow at her feet, slowing sinking in water and where all mirrors shatter around her. She ends up setting the whole house on fire with a match.

Charts

Weekly charts

References

2020s ballads
2021 singles
2021 songs
Bebe Rexha songs
Songs written by Bebe Rexha
Songs written by Greg Kurstin
Songs written by Jon Hume
Songs written by Michael Tighe
Warner Records singles
Pop ballads